Josse Le Plat (18 November 1732, Mechelen – 6 August 1810, Koblenz) was a legal scholar and law professor at Leuven University. 

He favored the reforms that Maria Theresa and later Joseph II wanted to make in higher education. In 1779, he published the Canons and Decrees of the Council of Trent, with preface, notes and variants.

References

1732 births
1810 deaths
Belgian educators
Belgian legal scholars
18th-century Latin-language writers
Academic staff of the Old University of Leuven
Jansenists